Hemant Anand Kinikar (born 6 December 1971) is an Indian former first-class cricketer who played for Maharashtra. He became a cricket coach after his playing career.

Career
Kinikar played as a right-handed opening batsman and occasional off break bowler. He made his first-class debut for Maharashtra against Saurashtra at the age of 20 during the 1992–93 Ranji Trophy and scored 110 and 47 in that match. He was the second highest run-scorer of the tournament finishing behind teammate Santosh Jedhe, with 754 runs in 8 matches, while Maharashtra reached the final of the tournament. He appeared in 37 first-class matches and 23 List A matches, including appearances for West Zone.

Kinikar took up cricket coaching after his retirement. In 2016, he was a coach at V. V. S. Laxman's academy in Hyderabad and head coach of the HK Bounce Cricket Academy in Pune.

References

External links
 
 

1971 births
Living people
Indian cricketers
Maharashtra cricketers
West Zone cricketers
Cricketers from Pune